Isma  is an Indomalayan genus of grass skippers in the family Hesperiidae.

Species
Listed alphabetically:
Isma binotata Elwes & Edwards, 1897 – Borneo
Isma bononia (Hewitson, 1868) – Singapore, Malaysia
Isma bononoides (Druce, 1912) – Borneo
Isma bonota Cantlie & Norman, 1959
Isma cinnamomea (Elwes & Edwards, 1897) – Borneo, Sumatra
Isma cronus (de Nicéville, 1894)
Isma dawna (Evans, 1926) – south Myanmar
Isma dichroa (Kollar, 1844)
Isma feralia (Hewitson, 1868) – Myanmar, Java
Isma flemingi Eliot, 1984 – Malaysia
Isma guttulifera (Elwes & Edwards, 1897) – Malaya
Isma hislopi Eliot, 1973 – Malaysia
Isma iapis (de Nicéville, 1890) – plain tufted lancer – Johor, Malaysia
Isma miosticta (de Nicéville, 1891) – Borneo, Malaysia
Isma protoclea (Herrich-Schäffer, 1869) – Myanmar
Isma umbrosa (Elwes & Edwards, 1897 – Borneo, Vietnam

Biology
The larvae feed on Musa, Pandanus.

References

Natural History Museum Lepidoptera genus database

External links

Isma, Funet Taxonomy

Hesperiinae
Hesperiidae genera